Moniack may refer to:

 Moniack Castle, Highland, Scotland, UK; a 16th-century tower house and listed building
 Moniack Burn, Highland, Scotland, UK; a small river, a burn
 Moniack Mhor (Great Moniack), Highland, Scotland, UK; a creative writing centre
 Moniack, Inverness, Highland, Scotland, UK; a locale in Inverness postal code; see IV postcode area
 Moniack Gorge, Inverness, Highland, Scotland, UK; a protected area; see List of Sites of Special Scientific Interest in Inverness

See also

 Moniac (disambiguation)
 Moniak (disambiguation)
 Monyak Hill, Antarctica
 Monjack